Xie Zhen (born 30 October 1998) is a Chinese footballer currently playing as a midfielder for Xi'an Hi-Tech Zone.

Club career
In February 2018, Xie signed for Portuguese club Vizela alongside compatriot Liu Sheng.

Career statistics

Club

Notes

References

1998 births
Living people
People from Rugao
Sportspeople from Nantong
Footballers from Jiangsu
Chinese footballers
Chinese expatriate footballers
Association football midfielders
Jiangsu F.C. players
F.C. Vizela players
Nantong Zhiyun F.C. players
Chinese expatriate sportspeople in Portugal
Expatriate footballers in Portugal